The canton of Moulins-1 (before March 2015: Moulins-Ouest) is an administrative division of the Arrondissement of Moulins in the Allier department in central France. It consists of the western part of the commune of Moulins and its western suburbs. It includes the following communes:
Aubigny
Avermes
Bagneux
Coulandon
Montilly
Moulins (partly)
Neuvy

See also
Cantons of the Allier department

References

Cantons of Allier